The Lightning Network (LN) is a "layer 2" payment protocol layered on top of Bitcoin (and other blockchains and cryptocurrencies). It is intended to enable fast transactions among participating nodes and has been proposed as a solution to the bitcoin scalability problem. It features a peer-to-peer system for making micropayments of cryptocurrency through a network of bidirectional payment channels without delegating custody of funds.

Normal use of the Lightning Network consists of opening a payment channel by committing a funding transaction to the relevant base blockchain (layer 1), followed by making any number of Lightning Network transactions that update the tentative distribution of the channel's funds without broadcasting those to the blockchain, optionally followed by closing the payment channel by broadcasting the final version of the settlement transaction to distribute the channel's funds.

To settle the payments the channel must be closed. To initiate this process one node broadcasts the most up to date settlement transaction to the network. The next events can broadly be thought of in two ways, a cooperative closure in which both parties confirm a distribution and funds are immediately settled and an uncooperative closure. Uncooperative closes may be legitimate for example if one node is no longer part of the network or fraudulent with one node broadcasting an outdated, incorrect distribution. In uncooperative closures the funds are not settled instantly but there is a dispute period within which nodes may contest the broadcast distribution. If the second node broadcasts a more up to date distribution then the funds are transferred entirely to them. This punitive act, known as the breach remedy transaction, prevents nodes from attempting to defraud the network by broadcasting out-of-date transactions.

History
Joseph Poon and Thaddeus Dryja published a draft of the Lightning Network white paper in February 2015.

2017 First Lightning Transaction On Litecoin 
On May 10, 2017, Christian Decker of Blockstream made the first full, secure Lightning payment on a non-test network, and the first Lightning payment on Litecoin, sending a microscopic payment not normally possible or economic on a blockchain, fully settled in a fraction of a second.

2019 Bitcoin Lightning Torch

On January 19, 2019, pseudonymous Twitter user hodlonaut began a game-like promotional test of the Lightning Network by sending 100,000 satoshis (0.001 bitcoin) to a trusted recipient where each recipient added 10,000 satoshis ($0.34 at the time) to send to the next trusted recipient. The "lightning torch" payment reached notable personalities including Twitter CEO Jack Dorsey, Litecoin Creator Charlie Lee, Lightning Labs CEO Elizabeth Stark, and Binance CEO "CZ" Changpeng Zhao, among others. The lightning torch was passed 292 times before reaching the formerly hard-coded limit of 4,390,000 satoshis. The final payment of the lightning torch was sent on April 13, 2019 as a donation of 4,290,000 satoshis ($217.78 at the time) to Bitcoin Venezuela, a non-profit that promotes bitcoin in Venezuela.

2021 Adoption In El Salvador

In June 2021, the Legislative Assembly of El Salvador voted legislation to make Bitcoin legal tender in El Salvador.  The decision was based on the success of the Bitcoin Beach ecosystem in El Zonte that used a LN based wallet. The government has introduced a wallet utilising the Lightning Network protocol while giving the freedom for citizens to use other Bitcoin Lightning wallets.

Design

Andreas Antonopoulos has referred to the Lightning Network as a second layer routing network. The payment channels allow participants to transfer money to each other without having to make all their transactions public on the blockchain. This is done by penalizing uncooperative participants. When opening a channel, participants must commit an amount (in a funding transaction, which is on the blockchain). Time-based script extensions like CheckSequenceVerify and CheckLockTimeVerify make the penalties possible.

The CheckSequenceVerify (CSV) Bitcoin Improvement Proposal details how Hash Time-Locked Contracts are implemented with CSV and used in Lightning: BIP 0112.

Implementations 
Lightning operates under a unified specification called the BOLT (Basis of Lightning Technology) specification. There are four major implementations of Lightning that implement the specification: Lightning Network Daemon, CoreLightning, Eclair, and Lightning Dev Kit.

Benefits
There are several claimed future benefits to using the Lightning Network compared to on-chain transactions:
Atomic Swap: The atomic swap was first introduced by Tier Nolan on the BitcoinTalk forums in 2013. Nolan outlined the basic principles for cross-chain cryptocurrency swaps by using simple cryptocurrency trades across different types of blockchains. Fast forward to September 2017, atomic swaps captured the attention of the cryptocurrency community at large when Litecoin founder Charlie Lee announced the successful execution of an atomic swap between Litecoin and Bitcoin over Twitter. 

Granularity: According to Andreas Antonopoulos, some implementations of the Lightning Network allow for payments that are smaller than a satoshi, the smallest unit on the base layer of bitcoin. Routing fees paid to intermediary nodes on the Lightning Network are frequently denominated in millisatoshis or msat.
Privacy: The details of individual lightning network payments are not publicly recorded on the blockchain. Lightning network payments may be routed through many sequential channels where each node operator will be able to see payments across their channels, but they will not be able to see the source nor destination of those funds if they are non-adjacent.
Speed: Settlement time for lightning network transactions is under a minute and can occur in milliseconds. Confirmation time on the bitcoin blockchain, for comparison, occurs every ten minutes, on average.
Transaction throughput: There are no fundamental limits to the amount of payments per second that can occur under the protocol. The amount of transactions are only limited by the capacity and speed of each node.

Limitations
The Lightning Network is made up of bidirectional payment channels between two nodes which combined create smart contracts. If at any time either party drops the channel, the channel will close and be settled on the blockchain.

Due to the nature of the Lightning Network's dispute mechanism, which requires all users to watch the blockchain constantly for fraud, the concept of a "watchtower" has been developed, where trust can be outsourced to watchtower nodes to monitor for fraud.

A period of 24 hours is allotted to create a bidirectional channel after receiving a request.

Routing 
In the event that a bi-directional payment channel is not open between the transacting parties, the payment must be routed through the network. This is done using an onion routing technique similar to Tor, and it requires that the sender and receiver of the payment have enough established peers in common to find a path for the payment. In effect, a simple route would look like this:

 Bob wants to pay Alice 1 BTC but Bob and Alice don't have a channel open with each other.
 Bob does have a channel open with Carol, and Alice also has a channel open with Carol 
 To route the payment, Bob sends 1 BTC to Carol, and Carol then sends 1 BTC to Alice 

The original whitepaper in reference to routing suggests that "eventually, with optimizations, the network will look a lot like Tier-1 ISPs".

Use cases
Cryptocurrency exchanges such as Bitfinex and Kraken use it to enable deposits and withdrawals. Laszlo Hanyecz, who gained fame in the cryptocurrency community for paying 10,000 BTC for two pizzas in 2010, bought two more pizzas in 2018 using Lightning Network and paid 0.00649 BTC.

References

External links

 lightning.network
 dci.mit.edu/lightning-network/
 lists.linuxfoundation.org/pipermail/lightning-dev/ on the Linux Foundation servers
 Amboss.Space Lightning Network Explorer & Marketplace

Cryptocurrencies